Allandale station can refer to:
 Allandale railway station (Scotland), a proposed railway station that was left unbuilt in Allandale, Falkirk, Scotland
 Allandale Waterfront GO Station, an in-service commuter railway station in Barrie, Ontario, Canada
 Allandale railway station, New South Wales, a disused railway station in New South Wales, Australia
 Allandale Station, South Australia, a locality
 Allandale Station (pastoral lease), a cattle station in South Australia

See also
Allandale (disambiguation)
Allendale railway station